Jeff Pitts (born 12 July 1950) is a former Australian rules footballer who played with Collingwood in the Victorian Football League (VFL).

Notes

External links 

1950 births
Australian rules footballers from Victoria (Australia)
Collingwood Football Club players
Living people